The Bunun, also historically known as the Vonum, are a Taiwanese indigenous people. They speak the Bunun language. Unlike other aboriginal peoples in Taiwan, the Bunun are widely dispersed across the island's central mountain ranges. In the year 2000, the Bunun numbered 41,038. This was approximately 8% of Taiwan's total indigenous population, making them the fourth-largest indigenous group. They have five distinct communities: the Takbunuaz, the Takituduh, the Takibaka, the Takivatan, and the Isbukun.

Y-chromosome DNA haplogroup 
According to a study published in 2014, the Y-DNA of the Bunun people belongs mainly to haplogroup O1a2-M50 (34/56 = 60.7%) or haplogroup O2a1a-M88 (21/56 = 37.5%), with a single representative of haplogroup P*-M45(xQ-M242, R-M207) (1/56 = 1.8%). Haplogroup O-M88 is rare among other aboriginal peoples of Taiwan and its vicinity, being found more commonly among populations of southwestern China and the northern parts of Mainland Southeast Asia, such as Tai peoples and Vietnamese.

History 

Until the coming of the Christian missionaries in the beginning of the 20th century, the Bunun were known to be fierce warriors and headhunters. The Bunun were one of the "high-mountain peoples" (along with the Atayal and the Taroko) who traditionally lived in small family units in Taiwan's Central Mountain Range and were hostile to all outsiders, whether they be Chinese immigrants or surrounding aboriginal peoples. Whereas most other aborigines were quite sedentary and tended to live in lower areas, the Bunun, along with the Atayal and Taroko were constantly on the move in Taiwan's Central Mountain Range, looking for new hunting grounds and practicing slash-and-burn agriculture. Their staple foods were millet, yam, and game.

During the Japanese rule (1895–1945), the Bunun were among the last peoples to be "pacified" by the Japanese government in residence. After an initial period of fierce resistance, they were forced to move down from the mountains and concentrated into a number of lowland villages that were spread across the Island. As a result, the family unit became less important and life centred on individual village units. The Japanese government restricted hunting practices (mainly to control the use of firearms) and introduced wet rice cultivation. The Bunun Aboriginals under Chief  (lāhè· āléi) engaged in guerilla warfare against the Japanese for twenty years. Raho Ari's revolt was sparked when the Japanese implemented a gun control policy in 1914 against the Aboriginals in which their rifles were impounded in police stations when hunting expeditions were over. The  began at Dafen when a police platoon was slaughtered by Raho Ari's clan in 1915. A settlement holding 266 people called Tamaho was created by Raho Ari and his followers near the source of the Laonong River and attracted more Bunun rebels to their cause. Raho Ari and his followers captured bullets and guns and slew Japanese in repeated hit and run raids against Japanese police stations by infiltrating over the Japanese "guardline" of electrified fences and police stations as they pleased. Many Bunun were recruited as local policemen and during WWII, the Japanese army had Bunun regiments.

In 1941 the Bunun were relocated following the Pasnanavan incident.

Throughout the 20th century, several waves of missionaries of various denominations spread across Taiwan. They were particularly successful with the aboriginal inhabitants of the island and after the last missionary wave in the 1940s, that originated in Japan, a majority of aborigines were converted to Christianity. Today, most Bunun either belong to the Catholic Church or to the local Presbyterian Church.

After the arrival of the Chinese Nationalist Kuomintang in October 1945, difficult days began for the aboriginal population. The "one language, one culture" policy of the Nationalist government prohibited to use of any language other than Standard Mandarin, for official use as well as in daily life, and indigenous cultures were systematically discriminated against and encouraged to assimilate into mainstream culture. Bunun culture was eroded by the joint pressure of their new faith as well as the government's sinification policies. The situation improved only recently after two decades of democratic reforms.

Culture 
According to Bunun legend, in times long past, two suns shone down upon the earth and made it unbearably hot. A father and a son endured numerous hardships and finally shot down one of the suns, which then became the moon. In its wrath, the moon demanded that father and son would return to their own people to tell them that they henceforth had to obey three commandments or face annihilation. The first was that they had to constantly observe the waxing and waning of the moon and conduct all rituals and work according to its rhythm. The second commandment stated that all Bunun had to conduct rituals throughout their lives to honor the spirits of heaven and earth. The third commandment told them of forbidden behaviours, and forced them to become an orderly and peaceful people.

A variant of the story tells that long, long ago, a mother and father went out working in the field and took their newly born son with them. While working, they put the child in a basket at the side of the field, and for a whole day he lay in the unbearable heat of the two suns. When the parents returned in the late afternoon, they found that their son had completely dried up and turned into a black lizard. Stricken by grief, the father took his bow and shot down one of the suns.

This story illustrates the importance of the sky in traditional Bunun animist religion. The Bunun assumed that the world in which they lived were full of supernatural beings (qanitu) that were often associated with particular places (trees, rocks, etc.). An important locus of supernatural power was the sky (dihanin/diqanin). All supernatural forces seem to have had a fairly abstract character and it is therefore not really clear whether the sky was a god or just a place in which all kinds of spirits lived.

It is certain, however, that the moon was considered to be one of the major spirits, and almost all activities in daily life had to be aligned with the lunar calendar. This could go very far, for instance, in a certain lunar month it was forbidden for women to wash themselves. The Bunun are the only aboriginal people in Taiwan that developed a primitive form of writing to record lunar cycles and their relationship to important events such as the harvest or the slaughter of pigs.

The prescriptions related to the lunar calendar are part of a larger system of prescriptions and taboos that used to govern all aspects of Bunun life. Many of these had a ritualistic character and all were part of an age-based pecking order where an absolute obedience to one's elders was demanded. For instance, in order to determine whether a man could go hunting, he had to wait till one of the elders had had a prophetic dream (matibahi). If the dream was good, he could go out hunting. A bad dream indicated that great mishap would befall the hunter if he would go in the woods, and the elders would forbid him to go. Most of these rules got into disuse after the coming of Christianity (which branded them as superstition), but present-day Bunun society has still retained a number of social rituals and still imposes a strong obligation on children to behave in a respectful and obedient way towards anyone that is older than themselves.

The Pasibutbut is a song of Bunun Sowing Festival, sung polyphonically in four-part harmony (Common 8 heterophonic voice, usually 5-12 heterophonic voices). The Taiwan composer Jin Fong Yang (楊金峯) analyzed the structure of this song. Japanese Musicologist Takatomo Kurosawa (黑澤隆朝) recorded with Bunun musicians in 1943.

The origin story of the Bunun people's tendency to live in mountainous areas was related by the wife of the American consul general in Yokohama in the following way:

Taiwan oil millet was one of the staple crops of the Bunun people until their 1941 relocation. In the 21st century Taiwanese oil millet cultivation has been revived.

Ear-shooting festival
Malahtangia, the ear-shooting festival is a male rite of passage ceremony in Bunun culture. The festival is usually held between March and April, and women are traditionally barred from attending. Before the festival, every adult male would journey to the mountains to hunt. Following a successful hunt, the men would return home and hang the carcasses from wooden frames so that the boys could shoot the dead animals. Those who could shoot a deer's ear were considered especially talented due to its small size. After this ritual, the participating boys were considered adults and could from then on join their brothers and fathers in the hunt.

With modern lifestyle changes in Bunun society, the ear-shooting festival has become more of a ritualized performance; though the marksmanship and hunting skills taught through the festival are no longer as relevant, the event is still considered beneficial as it teaches respect for elders and the community at large.

Bunun people
 Chiang Chih-chung, javelin thrower athlete
 Lin Tzu-wei, baseball player for the Boston Red Sox
 Sammi Kao, pop singer
 Sharon Kao, actress
 Eval Malinjinnan, quadrilingual artist, Sydney based interdisciplinary painter/designer

Tourist attractions
 Bunun Cultural Museum
 Bunun Leisure Farm

See also
 Demographics of Taiwan
 Taiwanese indigenous peoples

References

External links 

 Bunun Cultural and Educational Foundation
 Council of Indigenous People, Executive Yuan, Taiwan